Robert Bourne may refer to:

Robert Bourne (politician) (1888–1938), British rower and politician
Robert Bourne (doctor) (1761–1829), English physician and professor of medicine
Robert Bourne (footballer) (born 1998), English footballer

See also
Bob Bourne (born 1954), Canadian ice hockey left wing